Wijesinghe Herath Mudiyanselage Dharmasena (born 7 July 1955) is a Sri Lankan politician, former provincial councillor and Member of Parliament.

Dharmasena was born on 7 July 1955 in Okkampitiya in Monaragala District.  He is a businessman.

Dharmasena was a member of Buttala Divisional Council and Uva Provincial Council. He contested the 2020 parliamentary election as a Samagi Jana Balawegaya electoral alliance candidate in Monaragala District and was elected to the Parliament of Sri Lanka.

References

1955 births
Local authority councillors of Sri Lanka
Living people
Members of the 16th Parliament of Sri Lanka
Members of the Uva Provincial Council
People from Uva Province
Samagi Jana Balawegaya politicians
Sinhalese businesspeople
Sinhalese politicians
Sri Lankan Buddhists
United National Party politicians